Riesmarly Tokaay (born 11 February 2003) is a Curaçaoan footballer who plays as a midfielder for Hubentut Fortuna and the Curaçao women's national team.

International career
Tokaay capped for Curaçao at senior level during the 2018 CONCACAF Women's Championship qualification.

International goals
Scores and results list Curaçao's goal tally first

References

External links

2003 births
Living people
Women's association football midfielders
Curaçao women's international footballers
Curaçao women's footballers